The 25th Sony Radio Academy Awards were held on 30 April 2007 at the Grosvenor House Hotel, Park Lane in London.
There were 30 categories of award and three special awards.

Programme awards and winners

Personality awards and winners

Production awards and winners

Station awards and winners

Special awards
The Gold Award — Paul Gambaccini
The Broadcasters' Broadcaster Award - John Peel
The Lifetime Achievement Award - Tony Butler

References

External links
The Sony Radio Academy Awards

Sony Radio Academy Awards
Sony Radio Academy Awards
Radio Academy Awards